Col. Reginald Harvey Bicker OBE TD is a Northern Irish businessman and Fianna Fáil politician from Spa, County Down, though he is originally from Lisburn. He was a member of the President of Ireland's Council of State from 2005 to 2012. Bicker was formerly a councillor serving on Down District Council as a member of the Ulster Unionist Party (UUP) from 1997 to 2004. Peter Bowles was co-opted as the UUP's replacement on the Council following his appointment as Chairman of the Mourne National Park Working Party by Angela Smith. He is noted for being the first former Ulster unionist politician to affiliate with an Irish republican party after Fianna Fáil announced their intentions to organise on an All-Ireland basis.

Bicker is a retired colonel in the British Army, having served in the Royal Irish Regiment and Ulster Defence Regiment. He is a member of the Military Heritage of Ireland Trust.

References

Royal Irish Regiment (1992) officers
Ulster Defence Regiment officers
Military personnel from Lisburn
Ulster Unionist Party councillors
Fianna Fáil politicians
Members of Down District Council
Officers of the Order of the British Empire
Presidential appointees to the Council of State (Ireland)
Year of birth missing (living people)
Living people
Businesspeople from Northern Ireland
Military personnel from County Down